is a fictional species from the Pokémon franchise. A small, pink, Psychic-type Mythical Pokémon, it was added to Pokémon Red and Blue by its creator, Game Freak programmer Shigeki Morimoto, with the intent of making it obtainable, but was left out for development and technical reasons. After being discovered through data mining, its presence in the games was surrounded by rumors and myths, contributing to the Pokémon franchise's success. For years, Mew could not be legitimately obtained in the games except via Pokémon distribution events or glitching.

Mew's first film appearance was in Pokémon: The First Movie as a main character alongside Mewtwo. The movie revealed that a fossilized Mew eyelash, found in the Guyana jungle by a team of scientists, was used to create Mewtwo, a genetically enhanced Mew clone. Mew later appeared in Pokémon: Lucario and the Mystery of Mew as a main character alongside Lucario; the backstory of the film revolves around Mew's mysterious history and how it came to be so powerful. Pokémon: The Mastermind of Mirage Pokémon had a mirage version of Mew appear as a main character in the movie who helped Ash and friends try to defeat the Mirage Master.

Concept and creation
Unlike the older characters in the Pokémon franchise, Mew's development was not overseen by Ken Sugimori, but by Game Freak programmer Shigeki Morimoto. Morimoto programmed Mew into the game secretly as a prank amongst the staff just prior to its release in Japan. It was intended to be a Pokémon only Game Freak staff members would know about and be able to obtain. Mew was added at the very end of the development of Pokémon Red and Blue after the removal of debug features, freeing up just enough space to add the character despite being told not to alter the game any further at this point. Though not intended by the developers to be obtainable, due to a glitch, players were able to encounter it.

In the spring of 1996, Game Freak's president Satoshi Tajiri used the Japanese manga journal CoroCoro Comic as an experimental exhibition of Mew and distributed the first cards of it for the card game as free giveaways, which surprised many at Game Freak, including Morimoto. Due to the success of the experiment on April 15, 1996, Game Freak announced a contest to publicly release Mew to 151 winners, with the number referencing the number of Pokemon during that generation and Mew's Pokedex number. Tajiri described using Mew to create hype around an "invisible character" within the game and to keep interest alive in the title and create rumors and myths about the game passed around by word of mouth, which resulted in increased sales for the game.

Design and characteristics
Mew is a Psychic-type Pokémon with high stats. Morimoto designed it as a pale pink feliform creature with somewhat large eyes and a long, thin tail that broadens at the end,  though the shiny version is blue and rarely distributed. Its skin is covered with a layer of short, fine hair which may only be viewed under a microscope. Its DNA combines the genetic composition of all existing Pokémon species; the game states that scientists within the game view it as being the single ancestor of all other Pokémon. It is shy and rarely seen by humans. It is a Mythical Pokémon, though it was previously classified in non-Japanese media as a Legendary Pokémon alongside Pokémon such as Articuno, Zapdos, Moltres, and Mewtwo. Mew's number in the National Pokédex is 151, the last of the first-generation Pokémon, with 150 being Mewtwo and 152 being Chikorita. In the first-generation games and their remakes, the player can find journal entries in the Pokémon Mansion on Cinnabar Island stating that Mew was discovered deep in the jungles of Guyana, South America, on July 5 of an unspecified year, and named on July 10, and that it "gave birth" to Mewtwo on February 6. Both the Japanese name ミュウ, Myū, and its romanized form Mew are based on the English words mutant or mutation, as well as the onomatopoeia “mew”, the sound a kitten makes, referring to its size and cat-like appearance.

In the video games, it is possible for Mew to learn any move that can be taught (except for signature moves that only certain Pokemon know, unless if Mew uses the move Copycat). In addition to Ditto and Smeargle (through the Sketch technique), it can "transform" into other Pokémon. Due to its balanced statistics and ability to learn any move that comes from a Technical or Hidden Machine, Mew is regarded as one of the strongest Pokémon in Red, Blue, and Yellow. In the anime, it is capable of flight, teleportation, shapeshifting (via the move Transform), rendering itself invisible, and summoning bubbles of psychic energy for protection, amusement, or other purposes.

Studies on the impact of fictional characters on children, such as those in Pikachu's Global Adventure: The Rise and Fall of Pokémon, have noted Mew as popular with younger female children who tend to be drawn to "cute" characters; Mewtwo in comparison was described as a polar opposite, popular with older male children who tend to be drawn to "tough or scary" characters. The book Media and the Make-believe Worlds of Children noted a similar comparison, describing Mew as "child-like and gentle, combining characteristics of power and cute" and emphasizing the importance of the contrast for children between it and Mewtwo, and its role as a source of appeal for the character.

Appearances

In the video games
Mew is mentioned in Pokémon Red and Blue in the Cinnabar Mansion, in a journal referencing that Mew is in Guyana. For a time, Mew could only be legitimately obtained in the Pokémon video games via Nintendo promotional event distributions. Mew was first revealed and made available to the public in the April 1996 issue of CoroCoro Comics. This issue offered a promotion called the "Legendary Pokémon Offer", where 20 randomly selected entrants could send their cartridges in for Nintendo to add Mew to their games. At Nintendo promotional events soon after the release of Pokémon Red and Blue, players could have it downloaded to their games. This period ended with the release of My Pokémon Ranch, where Mew was accessible legitimately without an event distribution. Mew also appears as one of the Pokémon that can be released from the Poké Ball item in the Super Smash Bros. series. When sent out, it flies away from the stage, usually dropping rare items as it does so.

The creature has also long been accessible by the use of glitches or cheating devices. One of the glitches discovered in Pokémon Red, Blue, and Yellow involves exploiting programmed events. Walking into the view of a Trainer, then using a Pokémon's "Fly" or "Teleport" move (or "Dig" or the item "Escape Rope" in caves) to escape the area right before the Trainer notices the player, then battling a Pokémon with the correct Special stat in a different area and immediately returning to the original location starts a battle with a wild Mew. It also appeared in several Pokémon games such as Pokémon Diamond, Pokémon Pearl, Pokémon Platinum, Pokémon HeartGold and SoulSilver. Pokémon Black and White, Pokémon X and Y and Pokémon Omega Ruby and Alpha Sapphire. Mew also appears in Pokémon Go and New Pokémon Snap. Players can now easily get a Mew by buying a Poke Ball Plus, which contains only one Mew. The Mew from the Poke Ball Plus can be transferred to either Pokémon: Let's Go, Pikachu! and Let's Go, Eevee! or Pokémon Sword and Shield. Mew is also obtainable in Pokémon Brilliant Diamond and Shining Pearl if save data exists for one of the Let's Go games.

In the anime
Mew's first major appearance in the Pokémon anime was in Pokémon: The First Movie, where it served as one of the main characters. It was believed to be long-extinct and "the legendary and rare 'most powerful Pokémon ever. After years of research, scientists used a recombination of Mew's DNA to create Mewtwo, a genetically enhanced clone of Mew who becomes the film's main antagonist. The backstory of Pokémon: Lucario and the Mystery of Mew revolves around Mew's mysterious history and how it came to be so powerful. In the movie, a Pokémon "family tree" is shown; the first Pokémon on it is Mew, and the last is Ho-Oh. In Pokémon Journeys: The Series, Mew appeared in a flashback showing the childhood of Goh, Ash Ketchum's current traveling companion. Ever since that encounter, Goh is currently working his way to Mew by catching all known Pokemon in the world.

In the manga
Mew appears in the Pokémon Adventures series of Pokémon manga. Mew, also known as the "Phantom Pokémon" in the manga, appears in the first chapter when the criminal organization Team Rocket tries to capture it. Pokémon Trainer Red also tries to capture it, but he is easily defeated by Mew. In following chapters, it is revealed that Team Rocket wants to have Mew's DNA to finish the creation of Mewtwo, and Red and Trainer Green join forces to avoid it being captured.

Cultural impact

The reveal and distribution of Mew through organized events has been noted as a major reason for the series' success in Japan, with a promotion in the April 1996 issue of CoroCoro Comics called the "Legendary Pokémon Offer" offering 20 winners the opportunity to send their cartridges in for Nintendo to add Mew to their games. The offer received over 78,000 entries, exceeding Nintendo's initial expectation of 3000. Nintendo CEO Satoru Iwata called it "really when things turned round for Pokémon", noting that it caused weekly sales of Red and Green to match their previous monthly sales, subsequently becoming three to four times larger. Players who missed the in-person events were forced to unlock Mew with cheat devices such as the Pro Action Replay—fans often bought them solely for that purpose.

To promote the Pokémon franchise, Mew is one of the Pokémon featured in the 1998 painting on the All Nippon Airways Boeing 747-400.

In September 2006, in celebration of the release of Lucario and the Mystery of Mew and Pokémon Mystery Dungeon: Blue Rescue Team and Red Rescue Team, players with a copy of Ruby, Sapphire, Emerald, FireRed, or LeafGreen could go to a Toys "R" Us store to download the creature for free. Included in the DVD of Lucario and the Mystery of Mew was a promotional Mew trading card.

References

External links

 
Mew on Pokemon.com

Shapeshifter characters in video games
Pokémon species
Video game characters introduced in 1996
Fictional psychics
Video game characters who have mental powers
Video game characters who can turn invisible